The Soviet Banner of Victory was the banner raised by the Red Army soldiers on the Reichstag building in Berlin on 1 May 1945, the day after Adolf Hitler committed suicide. It was raised by three Soviet soldiers: Alexei Berest, Mikhail Yegorov, and Meliton Kantaria.

The Victory Banner, made under battlefield conditions, is the official symbol of the victory of the Soviet Union over Nazi Germany during the Second World War. It is also one of the national treasures of Russia. The Cyrillic inscription reads:<ref>Донесение командующего 3-й ударной армией начальнику главного политического управления Красной Армии о бое за Рейхстаг и водружении над ним знамени Победы // militera.lib.ru (in Russian)</ref>

Although this flag was not the only one to be hoisted on the Reichstag, it was the first and only survivor of all the "official" flags specially prepared to be raised there.

According to the Law of the Russian Federation, the Banner of Victory is to be stored forever in a place which provides its safety and public availability.

 Origin 

The origin of the banner comes from the report of the commander of the 3rd assault army to the head of political administration of The Red Army about the fight for Reichstag and placing the Victory Banner on it, dated 2 July 1945:

 Neutral, non-communist Victory Banner 

There is a variation of the Victory Banner, without the communist symbols red star, hammer and sickle, to which president Boris Yeltsin gave a status similar to that of the national flag, on 5 April 1996. President Vladimir Putin also adopted the Victory Banner as the official flag of the Russian Army. This flag was named after the flag raised on the Reichstag, but it is also called Victory Flag.

Today this variation is no longer an official symbol.Федеральный закон Российской Федерации «О знамени Вооруженных Сил Российской Федерации, знамени Военно-Морского Флота, знаменах иных видов Вооруженных Сил Российской Федерации и знаменах других войск»

The flags to be used for celebrations of the Soviet Victory Day were defined by a federal law.

Status in certain countries
Belarus
By decree of President Alexander Lukashenko on 6 May 1995, a duplicate of the Victory Banner was issued for duties on 9 May, 23 February and 3 July. The Flag of the USSR also holds an equivalent status. In 2011, Russia presented Belarus with one of the official copies of the Victory Banner, being kept at the Belarusian Great Patriotic War Museum.

Donetsk and Luhansk People's Republics

In the self-proclaimed, Donetsk People's Republic and Luhansk People's Republics on Victory Day, the Banner of Victory is utilized during military parades. In 2018, the parliaments of the DPR and LPR adopted laws "On the Banner of Victory", which established the status and legal basis for the use of copies of the Banner of Victory in the republics.Закон ДНР от 7 декабря 2018 года № 03-IIНС «О Знамени Победы»

Kazakhstan
On 21 April 2010, in the Hall of Fame of the Central Museum of the Great Patriotic War in Moscow, a ceremony where a copy of the Victory Banner was handed over to the Chief of Staff of the Administrative Department of the President of Kazakhstan. This copy is kept in the Museum of Nursultan Nazarbayev. The welcoming of the banner took place on 1 May in the Park of 28 Panfilov Guardsmen in Almaty.Знамя Победы: точка или многоточие в истории ВОВ? // www.unikaz.asia On 6 May 2015, accompanied by a guard of honor, an exact copy of the Victory Banner, made by Russian craftsmen, was transferred to the National Archives of Kazakhstan. Later on 12 June 2015, Russia handed over another copy to the Ministry of Defense of Kazakhstan. The banner was transferred for storage to the newly opened Museum of Arms and Military Equipment of the Armed Forces of Kazakhstan in Astana. On 23 December 2015, prior to the meeting of the Council of Ministers of Defense of the CIS, Russian Defense Minister Sergei Shoigu handed over another copy of the Victory Banner to the Kazakh Minister of Defense Imangali Tasmagambetov.

Transnistria
On 21 October 2009, the Supreme Council of Transnistria adopted a law on equating the Victory Banner with the Transnistrian Flag. In 2014, at the Memorial of Glory in Tiraspol, an official copy of the Victory Banner was handed over to Transnistria from Russia.

Ukraine
On 21 April 2011, the Verkhovna Rada of Ukraine adopted a law which was signed by President Viktor Yanukovych that established a procedure for the official use of the Victory Banner, specifically at the Tomb of the Unknown Soldier and the Monument to the Unknown Sailor. In June of that year, the Constitutional Court of Ukraine found this law unconstitutional.КС Украины признал неконституционным использование красного знамени Победы // www.rg.ru On 9 April 2015, the Verkhovna Rada adopted a new law which removed all mention of the Victory Banner. 

After the 2022 Russian invasion of Ukraine, Russian forces displayed the flag in numerous occupied locations, including government buildings. This was linked to both the upcoming Soviet-Russian Victory Day holiday on 9 May, as well as other forms of Soviet imagery used by Russian troops during the war as part of renewed Soviet nationalism under president Putin.

Events with the banner

Military parades
A planned part of the Moscow Victory Parade of 1945 was supposed to be the march of the Victory Banner, which was delivered to Moscow from Berlin on 20 June and was supposed to begin the procession of troops on 24 June. Despite this, the weak drill training of Yegorov, Kantaria and Stepan Neustroev forced Marshal Georgy Zhukov to not go ahead with this portion of the parade. On May 9, during Victory Day parade in Moscow, a copy of Victory Banner #5 is carried immediately behind the Russian flag by members of the Moscow Commandant's Regiment Honor and Colors Guards. (In 2015 the order was reversed.) During the Independence Day Parade and the Victory Parade in Minsk, the color guard consisting of the Flag of Belarus, the Victory Banner and the Flag of the USSR are the first to march in the parade. The Victory Banner was brought to Kyiv from Moscow in October 2004 to take part in the parade in honor of the 60th Anniversary of the Liberation of Ukraine. This is the first instance of Russia sending the banner to a former Soviet Republic. In 2015, the banner was brought to Astana (the capital of Kazakhstan) to be trooped through Kazakh Eli Square by personnel of the Aibyn Presidential Regiment in the Defender of the Fatherland Day parade on 7 May. In 2020, during the first Victory Parade held in Ashgabat, the Banner was brought from Russia to be trooped on the square near the Halk Hakydasy Memorial Complex.

Other uses
On 9 May 2017, the largest copy of the Victory Banner measuring 60 by 25 meters was deployed on Great National Assembly Square in the Moldovan capital of Chisinau. The banner was sewn at a local factory over a period of two weeks. In 2020, sailors of the Russian Northern Fleet raised the banner over distant parts of the Russian Arctic.

In philately

See also
Order of Victory
Victory Day (May 9)Raising a Flag over the Reichstag''

References

National symbols of Russia
Flags of the Soviet Union
Victory
Soviet Union in World War II
Special events flags
Socialist symbols